FC Viljandi may refer to:

FC Elva, Estonian football club founded in 2000 as FC Viljandi
FC Viljandi (2011), Estonian football club founded in 2011